Mihai Roman (born 16 October 1984) is a Romanian professional footballer who currently plays as a winger for Liga I club FC Botoșani.

Club career
Roman started his football career at the age of 17. He made his way up by being a hard worker, and with the help of Razvan Lucescu, his former coach from FC Brașov. Before signing for Braşov, Roman was linked with other Liga I clubs such as FC Vaslui and Oţelul Galaţi. After two great seasons there, he received his first call-up for the Romania national team in June 2009.

On 27 June 2010, Roman signed for Rapid București together with his teammate Sabrin Sburlea. On 29 May 2013, Roman signed for Ligue 1 club Toulouse FC on a free transfer for three seasons.

FCSB
On 20 August 2018, Mihai Roman signed a two-year contract with FCSB. On 23 August, he got his first cap for FCSB. His first match for FCSB, was in UEFA Europa League play-off against SK Rapid Wien. On 30 August, he scored his first goal in Europa League for FCSB on the second leg against SK Rapid Wien on Arena Națională finished 2–1 for FCSB. On 16 September, Mihai Roman made his debut for FCSB in Liga I against CFR Cluj finished 1-1.

International career
Roman made his debut for the Romania national football team in a 2010 FIFA World Cup qualification game, on 6 June 2009, against Lithuania.

Career statistics

Club

International

Honours
Bucovina Rădăuți
Divizia D – Suceava County: 2000–01

FC Brașov
Liga II: 2007–08

Rapid București
Cupa României runner-up: 2011–12

References

External links
 
 
 
  Mihai Roman profile at UEFA.com

Sportspeople from Suceava
1984 births
Living people
Liga I players
Liga II players
Liga III players
FC Brașov (1936) players
FC Rapid București players
FC Botoșani players
FC Steaua București players
Ligue 1 players
Toulouse FC players
Romanian footballers
Romania international footballers
Association football midfielders
Romanian expatriate footballers
Expatriate footballers in France
Romanian expatriate sportspeople in France